This is an incomplete list of ghost towns in Arkansas, United States of America.

References

External links
 Ghost Towns of Arkansas
 Ghost Towns of Arkansas
 Missing Ghost Towns of Arkansas
 Arkansas Memory Project - Rush Ghost Town
 Arkansas Ghost Towns - Treasure Quest Metal Detecting

 
Arkansas
Ghost towns
Ghost Towns